Parliamentary elections were held in Laos on 2 January 1972 to elect members of the National Assembly, the lower chamber of Parliament. The elections were contested by around 200 candidates, and more than two-thirds of incumbent MPs lost their seats. Voter turnout was 67.8%.

This would be the last election held in Laos before the Communists seized power in 1975. To date, it is also the last contested election held in the country.

Results

References

Laos
Parliamentary election
Elections in Laos
Laotian parliamentary election
Election and referendum articles with incomplete results